Ectenopsis is a genus of horse flies in the family Tabanidae.

Species
Ectenopsis angusta (Macquart, 1847)
Ectenopsis australis Ricardo, 1917
Ectenopsis erratica (Walker, 1848)
Ectenopsis fulva (Ferguson, 1921)
Ectenopsis fusca Mackerras, 1956
Ectenopsis hamlyni (Taylor, 1917)
Ectenopsis lutulenta (Hutton, 1901)
Ectenopsis mackerrasi Burger, 1996
Ectenopsis nigripennis Taylor, 1918
Ectenopsis norrisi Mackerras, 1956
Ectenopsis occidentalis Mackerras, 1956
Ectenopsis victoriensis Ferguson, 1921
Ectenopsis vittata Mackerras, 1955
Ectenopsis vulpecula (Wiedemann, 1828)

References

Tabanidae
Brachycera genera
Diptera of Australasia
Taxa named by Pierre-Justin-Marie Macquart